Chernozem (from ; "black ground"), also called black soil, is a black-colored soil containing a high percentage of humus (4% to 16%) and high percentages of phosphorus and ammonia compounds. Chernozem is very fertile soil and can produce high agricultural yields with its high moisture storage capacity. Chernozems are a Reference Soil Group of the World Reference Base for Soil Resources (WRB).

Distribution 

The name comes from the Russian terms for black and soil, earth or land (chorny + zemlya). The soil, rich in organic matter presenting a black color, was first identified by Russian geologist Vasily Dokuchaev in 1883 in the tallgrass steppe or prairie of Eastern Ukraine and Western Russia.

Chernozem cover about 230 million hectares of land. There are two "chernozem belts" in the world. One is the Eurasian steppe which extends from eastern Croatia (Slavonia), along the Danube (northern Serbia, northern Bulgaria (Danubian Plain), southern and eastern Romania (Wallachian Plain and Moldavian Plain), and Moldova, to northeast Ukraine across the Central Black Earth Region of Central and Southern Russia into Siberia. The other stretches from the Canadian Prairies in Manitoba through the Great Plains of the US as far south as Kansas. Chernozem layer thickness may vary widely, from several centimetres up to 1.5 metres (60 inches) in Ukraine, as well as the Red River Valley region in the Northern US and Canada (location of the prehistoric Lake Agassiz).

The terrain can also be found in small quantities elsewhere (for example, on 1% of Poland), Hungary, and Texas. It also exists in Northeast China, near Harbin. The only true chernozem in Australia is located around Nimmitabel, some of the richest soils on the continent.

Previously, there was a black market for the soil in Ukraine. The sale of agricultural land has been illegal in Ukraine since 1992 until the ban was lifted in 2020, but the soil, transported by truck, could be traded legally. According to the Kharkiv-based Green Front NGO, the black market for illegally acquired chernozem in Ukraine was projected to reach approximately US$900 million per year in 2011.

Canadian and United States soil classification 
Chernozemic soils are a soil type in the Canadian system of soil classification and the World Reference Base for Soil Resources (WRB).

Chernozemic soil type "equivalents", in the Canadian system, WRB, and US Department of Agriculture soil taxonomy:

History 
Theories of Chernozem origin:

 1761: Johan Gottschalk Wallerius (plant decomposition) 
 1763: Mikhail Lomonosov (plant and animal decomposition)
 1799: Peter Simon Pallas (reeds marsh)
 1835: Charles Lyell (loess)
 1840: Sir Roderick Murchison (weathered from Jurassic marine shales)  
 1850: Karl Eichwald (peat) 
 1851: А. Petzgold (swamps)
 1852: Nikifor Borisyak (peat)
 1853: Vangengeim von Qualen (silt from northern swamps) 
 1862: Rudolf Ludwig (bog on place of forests)
 1866: Franz Josef Ruprecht (decomposed steppe grasses) 
 1879: First chernozem papers translated from Russian 
 1883: Vasily Dokuchaev published his book Russian Chernozem with a complete study of this soil in European Russia.
 1929: Otto Schlüter (man-made)
 1999: Michael W. I. Schmidt (neolithic biomass burning)

As seen in the list above, the 19th and 20th-century discussions on the pedogenesis of Chernozem originally stemmed from climatic conditions from the early Holocene to roughly 5500 BC. However, no single paleo-climate reconstruction could accurately explain geochemical variations found in Chernozems throughout central Europe. Evidence of anthropomorphic origins of stable pyrogenic carbon in Chernozem led to improved formation theories. Vegetation burning could explain Chernozem's high magnetic susceptibility, the highest of the major soil types.  Soil magnetism increases when soil minerals goethite and ferrihydrite convert to maghemite on exposure to heat. Temperatures sufficient to elevate maghemite on a landscape scale indicates the influence of fire. Given the rarity of such natural phenomenon in the modern-day, magnetic susceptibility in Chernozem likely relates to control of fire by early humans.

Humification can darken soils (melanization) absent a pyrogenic carbon component. Given the symphony of pedogenic processes that contribute to the formation of dark earth, the term Chernozem summarizes different types of black soils with the same appearance but different formation histories.

See also 
 Loam
 Dark earth
 Terra preta

Notes

References 
 IUSS Working Group WRB: World Reference Base for Soil Resources, fourth edition. International Union of Soil Sciences, Vienna 2022. .

Further reading
 W. Zech, P. Schad, G. Hintermaier-Erhard: Soils of the World. Springer, Berlin 2022, Chapter 5.3.2.

External links 

 profile photos (with classification) WRB homepage
 IUSS profile photos (with classification) IUSS World of Soils

Canadian Prairies
Geology of Canada
Geology of Russia
Geology of the United States
Geology of Ukraine
Great Plains
Pedology
Types of soil